Hypomesus japonicus, the Japanese smelt, is a coastal fish species of the northwestern Pacific Ocean, ranging from the Korean Peninsula and northern Japan to the Kuril Islands and Peter the Great Bay.

Size and age
The maximum total length is about 25 centimeters, and the maximum weight is about 158 grams. The oldest reported age is 8 years.

Habitat and reproduction
Hypomesus japonicus is a marine species that enters freshwater coastal lagoons and estuaries. Spawning occurs in the month of May on beaches.

References

japonicus
Fish of the Pacific Ocean
Taxa named by J. Carson Brevoort
Fish described in 1856